Beloncio is one of 24 parishes (administrative divisions) in Piloña, a municipality within the province and autonomous community of Asturias, in northern Spain.

The population is 336 (INE 2011).

Villages and hamlets
 Abedul 
 Arenas 
 Beloncio 
 Candanedo
 Melendreras 
 Peruyero 
 Travesera
 Vallin 
 Beronda
 Ferreros 
 La Motosa 
 Peridiella
 El Raposo

References

Parishes in Piloña